Serbian passports are issued to Serbian citizens at any age, and it is the primary document of international travel issued by Serbia.

Passports are issued by the Ministry of Internal Affairs or, if the citizen resides abroad, at the embassy. Besides serving as proof of identity and of citizenship, they facilitate the process of securing assistance from Serbian consular officials abroad, if needed. Citizens can not have multiple Serbian passports at the same time.

Serbian biometric passports were introduced on 1 July 2008.

Appearance

Design

Current passports are issued in accordance with the "Law on Travel Documents" from 2007. Serbian passports have a burgundy red cover, in line with the EU standard, and have inscriptions in golden letters - РЕПУБЛИКА СРБИЈА, REPUBLIC OF SERBIA, and RÉPUBLIQUE DE SERBIE, at the top, and ПАСОШ, PASSPORT, and PASSEPORT at the bottom divided by the coat of arms (text in English and French added in 2016). The biometric passport symbol, alerting to the presence of a RFID chip inside the document, is at the very bottom of the cover page. The inside cover features the Serbian coat of arms in navy blue ink, while the first page contains the name of the country and the word "passport" in three languages - Serbian (Cyrillic script), English and French. The inside back cover contains information on consular assistance in the three aforementioned languages.

(Fun fact: The coat of arms used on the passport is outdated! The coat of arms was changed in 2010, but the Serbian passport still hasn't changed the coat of arms on itself to the current one. To this day, they still use an outdated Coat of Arms on the passport.)

Identity information page

The Serbian passport includes the following data:
 Type (‘P’ - Passport)
 Code for issuing country ("SRB" - Serbia)
 Passport serial number
 Name of bearer
 Nationality ("Republike Srbije" (Republic of Serbia))
 Date of birth (DD.MM.YYYY)
 National identity number ("JMBG")
 Sex
 Place of birth
 Place of residence
 Issuing office
 Date of issue (DD.MM.YYYY)
 Date of expiry (DD.MM.YYYY)
 Signature and photo of bearer

The identity page also contains the RFID chip.

Languages
The data page is printed in Serbian (Cyrillic script), English and French, while the personal data is entered in Serbian (Latin script).

Visa pages
The passport contains further 32 pages suitable for visas and border stamps. They feature a range of light colours, predominantly red, green, yellow and blue, and have the Serbian coat of arms in the middle. They are perforated with the passport's serial number on the bottom, and have watermarks with page numbers.

Types
Passports that can be issued are:
 Regular passport is issued to all citizens.
 Valid for 10 years, or for 5 years if issued to a person between 3 and 14 years of age and 3 years for person under 3 years old.
 Maximum processing time is 30 days for regular applications (60 days at diplomatic-consular missions), and 48 hours for urgent applications. Fee is RSD 3,600.00.
 Diplomatic passport is issued by the Ministry of Foreign Affairs to diplomats, high-ranking officials, members of the parliament and persons traveling on official state business, as well as to immediate family members of the above.
 Validity is determined by the nature of the position held - diplomats and officials will usually receive the passport covering their mandate in office.
 Official passport is identical in all aspects to the diplomatic passport, but lacks the privileges of diplomatic immunity. It is issued to mid and low-ranking officials, as well as to non-diplomatic staff at the embassies and consulates.
 In case of loss of a passport abroad, an emergency travel document is issued by the consulate, which is used by citizens of Serbia to return to country.
 A seaman's book is also considered a travel document.

International travel using Serbian biometric ID 

Serbian identity cards can be used instead of a passport for travel to some regional countries that have signed special agreements with the Serbian Government. Not all Serbian IDs feature contact-less RFID chips, so some are not fully ICAO9303 compliant biometric travel documents.

Visa requirement for Serbian citizens

As of 2022, Serbian citizens had visa-free or visa on arrival access to 136 countries and territories, ranking the Serbian passport 37th overall in terms of travel freedom according to the Henley Passport Index.

Serbian passport is one of the 5 passports with the most improved rating globally since 2006 in terms of number of countries that its holders may visit without a visa.

Kosovo Residents
Under Serbian law, people born in Kosovo or otherwise legally settled in Kosovo are by law considered Serbian nationals and as such they are entitled to a Serbian passport. However, these passports are not issued by the Serbian Ministry of the Interior. Instead they are issued by the Serbian Coordination Directorate. These particular passports do not allow the holder to enter the Schengen Area without a visa for a stay of less than three months within half a year, while Serbian citizens with passports issued by the Serbian Ministry of the Interior enjoy such a privilege. Bearers of passports issued by the Serbian Coordination Directorate require a Schengen visa for travel to the Schengen area since they are not covered by the Annex II list of countries allowed visa free entry to the Schengen Area. The European Union considered it impossible for Serbia to evaluate the issuing of birth records needed to apply for a passport and the integrity of the procedures applied by Serbia to check the authenticity of documents provided by applicants for that purpose.

Gallery

See also

 Serbian identity card
 Serbian nationality law
 Visa policy of Serbia
 Visa requirements for Serbian citizens

References

External links
 Ministry of Foreign Affairs

Passports by country
Foreign relations of Serbia